Ineta is a Latvian feminine given name. The associated name day is June 3.

Notable people named Ineta
Ineta Kravale (born 1959), Latvian skier
Ineta Mackevica (born 1992), Latvian squash player
Ineta Radēviča (born 1981), Latvian athlete
Ineta Ziemele (born 1970), Latvian jurist and judge at the Constitutional Court of Latvia

In fiction
Ineta Shirovs, EastEnders character

References 

Latvian feminine given names
Feminine given names